is a former Japanese football player. She played for Japan national team.

Club career
Nakaoka was born in Amagasaki on February 15, 1985. In 1997, she was 12 years old, she debuted in L.League at Takarazuka Bunnys. While she was a high school student, she left the league. After graduating from high school, she joined Tasaki Perule FC in 2003. However, the club was disbanded in 2008 due to financial strain. She moved to Speranza FC Takatsuki. In 2012, she moved to Albirex Niigata and retired end of season.

National team career
On May 21, 2005, when Nakaoka was 20 years old, she debuted for Japan national team against New Zealand. In 2006, she played at 2006 Asian Cup and 2006 Asian Games. She played 14 games for Japan until 2007.

National team statistics

References

External links

1985 births
Living people
Association football people from Hyōgo Prefecture
Japanese women's footballers
Japan women's international footballers
Nadeshiko League players
Bunnys Kyoto SC players
Tasaki Perule FC players
Speranza Osaka-Takatsuki players
Albirex Niigata Ladies players
Asian Games silver medalists for Japan
Asian Games medalists in football
Women's association football midfielders
Footballers at the 2006 Asian Games
Medalists at the 2006 Asian Games